Phlegmacium glaucopus is a species of fungus in the family Cortinariaceae. It is commonly known as the blue-foot webcap.

Taxonomy 
The species was first described as Agaricus glaucopus by Jacob Christian Schäffer in 1774. It was reclassified as Cortinarius glaucopus in 1821 by the British mycologist Samuel Frederick Gray. However the fully taxonomic history of this species is complicated by numerous proposed variants and forms.

Within the genus Cortinarius, it was classified in the subgenus Phlegmacium and section Glaucopodes. A 2014 genetic study confirmed it was synonymous with C. glaucopoides and that C. subrubrovelatus was a distinct species.

In 2022 a genomic study was carried out which radically reshaped the family Cortinariaceae resulting in many Cortinarius species being transferred to new or existing genera. C. glaucopus, C. glaucopoides and C. glaucopoides were among the species transferred to the Phlegmacium genus.

Common names in other languages include Schwachknolliger Klumpfuss (German), Cortinaire à pied glauque (French) and Szálaskalapú pókhálósgomba (Hungarian).

Description 
Like other members of the genus, young mushrooms are covered in a web-like veil (cortina) from the cap margin to the stipe. The bulbous stipe is 4–10 cm tall and 1–3 cm wide, pale lilac-blue initially with lower parts fading to yellow-white. The flesh is yellow-white with a blue hue in the upper stipe. The lilac-blue gills are adnate or free, and become brown as the spores mature. The smell, if present, is slightly mealy. The spore print is red-brown and the spores measure 6.5–8.5 by 4.5–5 µm.

Fruit bodies appear from August onwards into autumn in deciduous and coniferous forests, often in profuse numbers. It can be found in fairy rings.

Phlegmacium glaucopus is found in Western North America (both the United States and Canada), and is common in the Rocky Mountains. It is rare east of the Great Plains; it is rare in the British Isles.

P. glaucopus forms ectomycorrhizae that are unusually hydrophobic (water-repellent) compared with other fungi, which has led to interest in decoding its genome. DNA studies indicate it may decompose toxic polycyclic aromatic compounds in the soil with specially adapted oxidizing enzymes.

Habitat and distribution 
It is native to Europe and North America.

Similar species 
Similar species include C. caerulescens, C. pansa, C. sodagnitus, and C. subfoetens.

Edibility 
The flesh is mild tasting, and not highly regarded. It is considered inedible, and because it closely resembles many other species, including those that are deadly poisonous, it should definitely not be eaten. In Tlaxcala, Mexico, it is collected in June and sold in the market.

See also
 List of Cortinarius species

References

glaucopus
Fungi described in 1774
Fungi of Europe
Inedible fungi
Taxa named by Jacob Christian Schäffer